The David Mallett Jr. House, also known as The Mallett House, is a historical site located at 420 Tashua Road in Trumbull, Connecticut. It lies directly across Tashua Road from the Christ Episcopal Church and Tashua Burial Ground. The site consists of a  property and two buildings. The residence measures , was constructed in 1760, and is privately owned. It was added to the National Register of Historic Places in 1986.

It is an exceptionally well-preserved center-chimney colonial farmhouse, and has significance for its 150-year history of association with the Mallett family.

See also
History of Trumbull, Connecticut
National Register of Historic Places listings in Fairfield County, Connecticut

References

Buildings and structures in Trumbull, Connecticut
Houses completed in 1760
Houses in Fairfield County, Connecticut
National Register of Historic Places in Fairfield County, Connecticut
Houses on the National Register of Historic Places in Connecticut